Jamie Robinson (born 26 February 1972) is a footballer who played as a central defender in the Football League for Barnsley, Carlisle United, Torquay United, Exeter City and Chester City. He is now a first-team coach at Nottingham Forest having previously worked at The English Football Association as the head of coach development.

References

External links
 

Chester City F.C. players
1972 births
Living people
Footballers from Liverpool
Association football defenders
English footballers
English Football League players
Barnsley F.C. players
Carlisle United F.C. players
Torquay United F.C. players
Exeter City F.C. players
Liverpool F.C. players
Nottingham Forest F.C. non-playing staff